Morchard is a town and locality in the Australian state of South Australia located on the Wilmington-Ucolta Road in the state's Mid North region.

The Morchard Hotel, which is still standing today, was opened in 1878. The licensee was George Dowdy.

References

Towns in South Australia